Nikolaevsk could be:

 Nikolaevsk, Alaska, United States
 Nikolayevsk-on-Amur, a town in Khabarovsk Krai, Russia
 Nikolaevsk-Na-Amure Air Enterprise
 Nikolayevsk, a town in Volgograd Oblast, Russia